Paul David Morrell (born 23 March 1961) is an English former footballer who played as a defender in the Football League for Bournemouth. He scored the winning goal in the first Football League Trophy Final, then known as the Associate Members' Cup, when Bournemouth beat Hull City 2–1 at Boothferry Park on 24 May 1984.

He now works for the probation service in the Bournemouth area.

References

External links
 Paul Morrell stats at Neil Brown stat site

English footballers
English Football League players
1961 births
Living people
Weymouth F.C. players
AFC Bournemouth players
Salisbury City F.C. players
Association football fullbacks